No. 51 Commando was a battalion-sized British Commando unit of the British Army during the Second World War. The commando was formed in 1940, from Jewish and Arab volunteers from Palestine. The Commando fought against the Italians in Abyssinia and Eritrea before it was absorbed into the Middle East Commando.

Background
The commandos were formed in 1940, by the order of Winston Churchill the British Prime Minister. He called for specially trained troops that would "develop a reign of terror down the enemy coast".  At first they were a small force of volunteers who carried out small raids against enemy occupied territory, but by 1943 their role had changed into lightly equipped assault Infantry which specialised in spearheading amphibious landings. 

The man initially selected as the overall commander of the force was Admiral Sir Roger Keyes himself a veteran of the landings at Galipoli and the Zeebrugge raid in the First World War. Keyes resigned in October 1941 and was replaced by Admiral Louis Mountbatten.

By the autumn of 1940 more than 2,000 men had volunteered for commando training, and what became known as the Special Service Brigade was formed into 12 units called commandos. Each commando would number around 450 men commanded by a lieutenant colonel. They were sub divided into troops of 75 men and further divided into 15-man sections. Commandos were all volunteers seconded from other British Army regiments and retained their own cap badges and remained on their regimental roll for pay. All volunteers went through the six-week intensive commando course at Achnacarry. The course in the Scottish Highlands concentrated on fitness, speed marches, weapons training, map reading, climbing, small boat operations and demolitions both by day and by night.  

By 1943 the commandos had moved away from small raiding operations and had been formed into brigades of assault infantry to spearhead future Allied landing operations. Three units were left un-brigaded to carry out smaller-scale raids.

In December 1940 a Middle East Commando depot was formed with the responsibility of training and supplying reinforcements for the commando units in the Middle East.

No. 51 Commando formation
No. 51 Commando was raised in October 1940, under the command of Lieutenant Colonel Henry J. Cator, M.C. from 300 Palestinian volunteers from No. 1 Company, Auxiliary Military Pioneer Corps. The Commando fought against the Italians in the East African Campaign in Abyssinia and Eritrea.

In 1941, Winston Churchill ordered the formation of the Middle East Commando, made up from the commandos that remained in the Middle East. There were very few men left by this time, what men there were, were formed into six troops. No. 1 and 2 Troops were made up of L Detachment based at Geneifa under the command of David Stirling, while 60 men from the disbanded No. 11 (Scottish) Commando made up No. 3 Troop.  No. 51 Commando made up No. 4 and No. 5 Troops and the Special Boat Section made up No. 6 Troop. These designations, however, were largely ignored as the men referred to themselves by their old designations.

Battle honours
The following Battle honours were awarded to the British Commandos during the Second World War.

Adriatic 
Alethangyaw 
Aller 
Anzio
Argenta Gap 
Burma 1943–45 
Crete 
Dieppe
Dives Crossing
Djebel Choucha 
Flushing
Greece 1944–45
Italy 1943–45 
Kangaw
Landing at Porto San Venere
Landing in Sicily 
Leese 
Litani
Madagascar
Middle East 1941, 1942, 1944 
Monte Ornito
Myebon 
Normandy Landing
North Africa 1941–43
North-West Europe 1942, 1944–1945 
Norway 1941
Pursuit to Messina 
Rhine
St. Nazaire
Salerno 
Sedjenane 1
Sicily 1943 
Steamroller Farm 
Syria 1941 
Termoli 
Vaagso
Valli di Comacchio 
Westkapelle

References
Notes

Bibliography

51
Military units and formations established in 1940
Military units and formations disestablished in 1941
1940 establishments in the United Kingdom
1941 disestablishments in the United Kingdom